The Aberdeen Mosque and Islamic Centre (AMIC) is the largest main mosque and Islamic centre in North East of Scotland and Aberdeen, Scotland. AMIC is a charitable, non profitable, non political organisation.  Its purpose is to hold congregational prayers and Islamic religious activities, with provision of free religious services to members of the Muslim community relating to Islamic marriage,  birth, death and burial in accordance with Scottish law. AMIC also aims to promote unity and provide channels for better communication and understanding between the Muslims and non Muslims in the area. The mosque contributes to the local community by promoting and participating in projects related to areas of social concern. It operates from its new location at Frederick Street.

Occasionally, AMIC, as well as other mosques in Aberdeen, host various types of open days to accommodate and provide some insight for the wider community.

History
The mosque was founded by a small number of University of Aberdeen students and some local business people in 1980. Initially the mosque was located in a small house beside the university. As the Muslim community grew bigger, several neighbouring houses were purchased to accommodate the growing number of worshippers.

The mosque has moved to a larger site on Frederick Street which  serves as the Central Mosque for the Muslim Community of Aberdeen city, Shire and wider area. The site on the Spital is open and primarily used by students and nearby residents.

Education 
AMIC currently operated several schools during Weekdays, Friday and Weekend which all cater for a range of individuals. These include AMIC Madrasah, Al-Noor Islamic School, privately run classes for iGCSE Islamic Studies, and a Friday evening school for girls which runs alongside its counterpart for boys in Masjid Alhikmah and Community Centre.

See also
 Religion in Aberdeen
 Islam in Scotland

References

External links

 

1980 establishments in Scotland
Buildings and structures in Aberdeen
Mosques in Scotland
Mosques completed in 1980
Sunni Islam in the United Kingdom